The King R&B Box Set is a four-disc box set of King Records' greatest hits.

Track listing

Track information and credits taken from the album's liner notes.

References

1996 compilation albums
King Records (United States) albums
Record label compilation albums